Agave america var. franzosinii  is an evergreen plant in the family Asparagaceae, subfamily Agavoideae. It is widely cultivated in many places, and has been known by several names, including Agave franzosinii and Agave beaulueriana. The original reports say that the species is native to Mexico, but a more detailed location was not provided. The species has reportedly become naturalized in the Leeward Islands of the Caribbean. The leaves appear at the base of the plant, its flowers are funnel-shaped and yellow.

References

america var. franzosinii
Flora of Mexico
Flora of the Leeward Islands
Plants described in 1869